The United Nations Educational, Scientific and Cultural Organization (UNESCO) World Heritage Sites are places of importance to cultural or natural heritage as described in the UNESCO World Heritage Convention, established in 1972. Cultural heritage consists of monuments (such as architectural works, monumental sculptures, or inscriptions), groups of buildings, and sites (including archaeological sites). Natural features (consisting of physical and biological formations), geological and physiographical formations (including habitats of threatened species of animals and plants), and natural sites which are important from the point of view of science, conservation or natural beauty, are defined as natural heritage. Austria ratified the convention on December 18, 1992, making its historical sites eligible for inclusion on the list.

Sites in Austria were first inscribed on the list at the 20th Session of the World Heritage Committee, held in Mérida, Mexico in 1996. At that session, two sites were added: the Historic Centre of Salzburg, and the Palace and Gardens of Schönbrunn. , Austria has 12 sites inscribed on the list and a further 10 on the tentative list. Five World Heritage Sites are shared with other countries: Fertő / Neusiedlersee Cultural Landscape is shared with Hungary; Prehistoric pile dwellings around the Alps with France, Germany, Italy, Slovenia and Switzerland; Ancient and Primeval Beech Forests of the Carpathians and Other Regions of Europe with 17 European countries; the Great Spa Towns of Europe with Belgium, Czechia, Germany, France, Italy, and the United Kingdom; and the Danube Limes with Germany and Slovakia. In 2017, the site Historic Centre of Vienna was inscribed on the list of World Heritage in Danger due to planned new high-rise buildings.
All but one of the World Heritage Sites in Austria are of the cultural type.

World Heritage Sites 
UNESCO lists sites under ten criteria; each entry must meet at least one of the criteria. Criteria i through vi are cultural, and vii through x are natural.

Tentative list
In addition to sites inscribed on the World Heritage list, member states can maintain a list of tentative sites that they may consider for nomination. Nominations for the World Heritage list are only accepted if the site was previously listed on the tentative list. , Austria recorded 10 sites on its tentative list.

Notes

References

External links
 Austrian National Commission for UNESCO

 
Austria
World Heritage Sites